Alexander Cemetery may refer to:

Alexander Cemetery (Rostov-on-Don), a cemetery in Rostov-on-Don, Russia
Alexander Cemetery (Hebbardsville, Ohio) 
Alexander Cemetery (Madera, Pennsylvania) 
Alexander Cemetery (Carterville, Missouri)
Alexander Cemetery (Bow Junction, New Hampshire)
Alexander Cemetery (Walnut, Mississippi) 
Alexander Cemetery in Manifest, Louisiana